Make Me Feel Better may refer to:

 "Make Me Feel Better" (Alex Adair song), 2014
 "Make Me Feel Better", a 1977 song by Michael Henderson from Solid
 "Make Me Feel Better", a 2002 song by Natas from Godlike